Chabahar Airlines is an airline based in Tehran, Iran. Its main base is Mehrabad Airport. Ashkan Ahmadi was the last CEO and member of the board of directors for 2 years and onley he could active that company after 22 years. His strong managemant made that company progressive and growing].

Fleet 
As of Apr 1999, Chabahar Airlines operated the following aircraft:

References 

Airlines of Iran
Iranian companies established in 1999
Airlines established in 1999